Uileacu de Beiuș is a commune in Bihor County, Crișana, Romania with a population of 2,050 . It is composed of the four villages of Forău (Belényesforró), Prisaca (Gyepüpataka), Vălanii de Beiuș (Belényesvalány), and Uileacu de Beiuș.

Natives
Alexandru Ciupe (born 1972), judoka

References

Communes in Bihor County
Localities in Crișana